Graeme Arthur Rogerson  is a New Zealand Thoroughbred racehorse trainer. He is notable for having trained more race-day winners than any other trainer in New Zealand and for having won many Group One races in New Zealand and Australia.

Biography 
Rogerson was raised in Te Rapa. Before training he tried his hand at amateur riding. He originally trained horses at Cambridge before moving to Tuhikaramea Road in the 1970s. For a time he has trained in successful partnerships with Stephen Autridge and Keith Hawtin.  Rogerson was the youngest New Zealand trainer to get to 1,000 winners.

Rogerson branched out and established stables and partnerships in Australia and Dubai.

Graeme's wife, Debbie, joined him in a training partnership and his grand-daughter, Bailey, later joined the partnership which was called Team Rogerson 

In the 2004 Queen's Birthday Honours, Rogerson was appointed a Member of the New Zealand Order of Merit (MNZM), for services to the thoroughbred industry.

In 2012 Rogerson was inducted into the New Zealand Racing Hall of Fame and at that time he had trained well over 3,500 winners and won the New Zealand trainers premiership twelve times.

Notable horses and victories

Rogerson has trained or co-trained a large number of high-class horses, including:
  
 Batavian: winner of the 1996 Hawke's Bay Guineas and 1998 Mudgway Stakes
 Beauden: winner of the 2021 Awapuni Gold Cup
 Blanchard: winner of the 2002 Trentham Stakes
 Costume: winner of the 2014 New Zealand International Stakes and Spring Classic
 Efficient: winner of the 2006 Victoria Derby, the 2007 Melbourne Cup and the 2009 Turnbull Stakes.
 Just A Dancer: winner of the 1991 Sydney Cup and Brisbane Cup
 Kaaptive Edition: winner of the 1993 H E Tancred Stakes
 Katie Lee: winner of the 2009 New Zealand 1000 Guineas and New Zealand 2000 Guineas
 Keeninsky: winner of the 2004 Manawatu Sires Produce Stakes and 2005 Telegraph Handicap
 Lashed: winner of the 2004 New Zealand Stakes, New Zealand International Stakes and Zabeel Classic
 Polar Success: winner of the 2003 Golden Slipper Stakes
 Savabeel: winner of the 2004 Spring Champion Stakes and Cox Plate
 Savannah Success: winner of the 1999 New Zealand Oaks
 Scarlett Lady: winner of the 2011 Manawatu Breeders Stakes, Doomben Roses and Queensland Oaks and the 2012 New Zealand Stakes
 Sharp ‘n’ Smart: winner of the 2022 Gloaming Stakes and Spring Champion Stakes and 2023 Herbie Dyke Stakes and New Zealand Derby
 Skating: winner of the 1993 Doncaster Handicap
 Smiling Like: winner of the 2000 New Zealand Cup, 2001 Trentham Stakes and Wellington Cup
 Soriano: winner of the 2014 Zabeel Classic and Awapuni Gold Cup and the 2015 New Zealand International Stakes
 Taatletail: winner of the 2003 New Zealand 1000 Guineas
 Teddy Doon: winner of the 1978 Manawatu Sires Produce Stakes and New Zealand 2000 Guineas
 Vegas: winner of the 1998 Telegraph Handicap.

Harness racing
Rogerson has also been a registered harness racing trainer since 2008 and has trained in partnerships with:

 Peter Simpson (2008-2009).
 Steven Reid (2009-2011).
 Peter Blanchard (2012-2015).
 Dylan Ferguson (2021-2022).

See also

 Murray Baker
 Opie Bosson
 Roger James
 Trevor McKee
 Lance O'Sullivan
 Jamie Richards
 Chris Waller
 Thoroughbred racing in New Zealand
 Harness racing in New Zealand

References 

Graeme Rogerson MNZM / Trainer Profile / RaceInfo / LOVERACING.NZ

New Zealand racehorse trainers
Sportspeople from Waikato
Members of the New Zealand Order of Merit
New Zealand Racing Hall of Fame inductees
Year of birth missing (living people)
Living people